Jing Machar Reec (born Jing Lual; 12 June 2003) is an Australian professional soccer player who plays as a forward for AGF.

Career
On 9 August 2021, Central Coast Mariners confirmed that Reec had joined Danish Superliga club AGF.

He made his debut for AGF as a substitute in a win over Frem in the 2021–22 Danish Cup on 23 September 2021.

References

External links

Living people
Australian soccer players
Sudanese footballers
Sudanese emigrants to Australia
Australian expatriate soccer players
Association football forwards
Marconi Stallions FC players
Central Coast Mariners FC players
Aarhus Gymnastikforening players
National Premier Leagues players
A-League Men players
Australian expatriate sportspeople in Denmark
Expatriate men's footballers in Denmark
2003 births